NVIDIA System Tools (previously called nTune) is a discontinued collection of utilities for accessing, monitoring, and adjusting system components, including temperature and voltages with a graphical user interface within Windows, rather than through the BIOS.

Additionally, System Tools has a feature that automatically adjusts settings and tests them to find what it believes to be the optimal combination of settings for a particular computer hardware configuration. Everything, including the graphics processing unit (GPU), central processing unit (CPU), Media Communications Processor (MCP), RAM, voltage and fans are adjusted, though not all motherboards support all of these adjustment options.

Configurations can also be saved. This allows the end user to toggle between performance gaming profiles, quiet profiles for less demanding work, or some other profile that is usage-specific.

NVIDIA System Tools is also a front end for the BIOS. Most settings that can be changed in the BIOS are available in the utilities included. BIOS and driver updates to both nForce and GeForce hardware can also be done through System Tools. It additionally supports hardware which is certified under the Enthusiast System Architecture and connects to the motherboard via USB.

Previously supported motherboard chipsets 
The following chipsets were supported in nTune releases, but are no longer supported by NVIDIA System Tools.
 nForce 220, nForce 220D, nForce 415 and nForce 420D
 nForce2 and nForce2 400
 nForce2 Ultra and nForce2 Ultra 400
 nForce2 400R and nForce2 Ultra 400Gb
 nForce3 150 and nForce3 PRO 150
 nForce3 250, nForce3 250Gb and nForce3 PRO 250

Currently supported motherboard chipsets 
 nForce4 Pro 2200, nForce4 Ultra, nForce4 SLI, and nForce4 SLI x16
 nForce 590 SLI, nForce 570 SLI, nForce 570 LT SLI, nForce 570 Ultra, nForce 560, nForce 550, nForce 520, and nForce 520 LE
 nForce 680a SLI, nForce 680i SLI, nForce 680i LT SLI, nForce 650i SLI, nForce 650i Ultra, nForce 630a, nForce 630i, and nForce 610i
 nForce 790i Ultra SLI, nForce 790i SLI, nForce 780a SLI, nForce 780i SLI, nForce 750a SLI, nForce 750i SLI, nForce 730a, nForce 720a, and nForce 710a

Supported graphics processors 
The following GPUs are supported for overclocking and temperature monitoring.
 GeForce 5 (FX)
 GeForce 6
 GeForce 7
 GeForce 8
 GeForce 9
 GeForce 200
 GeForce 300
 GeForce 400
 GeForce 500

BIOS
Nvidia software
Windows-only software